The 2022–23 Ohio Bobcats women's basketball team represented Ohio University during the 2022–23 NCAA Division I women's basketball season. The Bobcats, led by tenth year head coach Bob Boldon, played their home games at the Convocation Center in Athens, Ohio as a member of the Mid-American Conference.  They finished 6–23 and 4–14 in the MAC play to finish tied for eleventh in the MAC.  They failed to qualify for the MAC tournament.

Previous season

They finished the regular season 15–13 and 9–10 in the MAC.  They were knocked out of the MAC tournament in the quarterfinals by top-seeded Toledo and in the first round of the WNIT by South Dakota State. During a conference win at Central Michigan on January 15, Cece Hooks passed Caroline Mast as the leading scorer in Ohio basketball history. Two games later, against Bowling Green, she passed Toldeo’s Kim Knuth as the leading scorer in MAC basketball history.

Offseason

Coaching Staff Changes

Coaching Departures

Coaching Additions

Departures

Incoming transfers

2022 recruiting class

Preseason
Prior to the season Ohio was picked seventh in the MAC preseason poll.   No Bobcats were named to the preseason All-MAC team.

Preseason rankings

MAC Tournament Champion: Toledo (9), Ball State (3)
Source

Roster

Support Staff

Schedule

|-
!colspan=9 style=| Non-conference regular season

|-
!colspan=9 style=| MAC regular season

Awards and honors

All-MAC Awards 

Source

References

Ohio
Ohio Bobcats women's basketball seasons
Ohio Bobcats women's basketball
Ohio Bobcats women's basketball